When Knights Were Bold is a 1929 British silent adventure film directed by Tim Whelan and starring Nelson Keys, Miriam Seegar and Eric Bransby Williams. It was adapted from the 1906 play When Knights Were Bold by Harriett Jay and made at Cricklewood Studios.

Cast
 Nelson Keys as Sir Guy de Vere 
 Miriam Seegar as Lady Rowena 
 Eric Bransby Williams as Sir Brian Ballymore 
 Wellington Briggs as Widdicombe 
 Lena Halliday as Lady Walgrave 
 Martin Adeson as Barker 
 Hal Gordon as Whittle 
 Edith Kingdon as Aunt Thornridge 
 E. L. Frewyn as Dean

References

Bibliography
 Low, Rachael. The History of British Film, Volume 4 1918-1929. Routledge, 1997.

External links

1929 films
1920s English-language films
Films directed by Tim Whelan
British silent feature films
British adventure films
1929 adventure films
Films shot at Cricklewood Studios
British films based on plays
Films set in England
British black-and-white films
British and Dominions Studios films
Silent adventure films
1920s British films